Love Life is a 2022 Japanese-French drama film written and directed by Kōji Fukada. Set in contemporary Japan, the film is inspired by song of the same name recorded in the album "Love Life", released by musician Akiko Yano in 1991. It revolves around Taeko and her husband, Jiro facing "love" and "life".

The film was selected 'In competition' section of 79th Venice International Film Festival, where it competed for Golden Lion award and had its premiere on 5 September 2022.

Synopsis
The film follows a married woman, Taeko, who lives happily with her husband, Jiro.  She decides to care for long-lost Park, father of her  son Keita, when Park reappears deaf, ill, and homeless.

Cast
 Fumino Kimura as Taeko
 Kento Nagayama as Jirō
 Atom Sunada as Park 
 Hirona Yamazaki as Yamazaki, Jiro's ex-girlfriend 
 Misuzu Kanno as Myoe, Jiro's mother
 Tomorowo Taguchi as Makoto
 Tetsuta Shimada as Keita, Taeko's son
 Mito Natsume as a staff member who works in the same place as Taeko

Release
The film had its world premiere at the 79th Venice International Film Festival on 5 September 2022, and competed for Golden Lion in 'In competition' section. It was released in Japan on 9 September 2022, and held its North American Premiere at 2022 Toronto International Film Festival in 'Contemporary World Cinema' section on 12 September 2022 at Scotiabank Theatre, Toronto. MK2 Films have taken the distribution rights of the film for Europe in February 2022. It also made it to 'A Window on Asian Cinema' section of 27th Busan International Film Festival and was screened in October 6, 2022.

Reception
On the review aggregator Rotten Tomatoes, the film has an approval rating of 85% based on 13 reviews, with an average rating of 6.50/10.

Guy Lodge of Variety wrote: "While it’s impossible not to be affected at some level by its characters’ hellish plight, the predominant softness of tone here tends toward the wispy." David Ehrlich of IndieWire graded the film with B+ and wrote, "An enormously poignant melodrama told at the volume of a broken whisper, Kōji Fukada’s Love Life represents a major breakthrough for a filmmaker who’s found the perfect story for his probing but distant style."

Awards and nominations

References

External links
 
 Love Life at Venice Film Festival 
 
 

2022 films
2022 drama films
Films shot in Japan
French drama films
Japanese drama films
2020s French films